Sabahattin Ali (25 February 1907 – 2 April 1948) was a Turkish novelist, short-story writer, poet, and journalist.

Early life

He was born in 1907 in Eğridere township (now Ardino in southern Bulgaria) of the Sanjak of Gümülcine (now Komotini in northern Greece), in the Ottoman Empire. His father was an Ottoman officer, Selahattin Ali, and his mother Husniye. His father's family was from the Black Sea region. He lived in Istanbul, Çanakkale and Edremit before he entered the Teacher School in Balıkesir. His elementary and middle school education was interrupted by WWI, contributing to his difficult childhood. Then he was transferred from Balikesir to the School of Education in Istanbul, where he graduated in 1926 with a teacher's certificate. His various poems and short stories were published in the school’s student paper. After serving as a teacher in Yozgat for one year, he earned a fellowship from the Ministry of National Education and studied in Potsdam, Germany from 1928 to 1930. When he returned to Turkey, he taught German language in high schools at Aydın and Konya.

Later years 
While he was serving as a teacher in Konya, he was arrested for a poem he wrote criticizing Atatürk's policies, and accused of libelling two other journalists. He wrote a poem to Atatürk later stating "I was sentenced to prison for 1 year. What saddens me the most is not the sentence, but that your name is dragged into this as a means of personal revenge. I did not do such a thing and I want you to believe it. I ask for forgiveness. I can prove my innocence to an unprejudiced court free of ill thoughts and needless fears".

Having served his sentence for several months in Konya and then in the Sinop Fortress Prison, he was released in 1933 in an amnesty granted to mark the 10th anniversary of the declaration of the Republic of Turkey. He then applied to the Ministry of National Education for permission to teach again. After proving his allegiance to Atatürk by writing the poem "Benim Aşkım" (literally: My Love or My Passion), he was assigned to the publications division at the Ministry of National Education. Sabahattin Ali married Aliye on 16 May 1935 and had a daughter, Filiz. He did his military service in 1936. He was called back to military service twice during WWII, like most Turkish adult males at the time. He was imprisoned again and released in 1944. He also founded and edited a popular weekly magazine called Marko Paşa (pronounced "Marco Pasha"), together with Aziz Nesin and Rıfat Ilgaz. In the period between 1941 and 1944 he was among the directors of a monthly sociology journal entitled Yurt ve Dünya based in Ankara.

Death

Upon his release from prison, he suffered financial troubles. His application for a passport was denied. He was killed at the Bulgarian border, probably on 1 or 2 April 1948. His body was found on 16 June 1948. It is generally believed that he was killed by Ali Ertekin, a smuggler with connections to the National Security Service, who had been paid to help him pass the border. Another hypothesis is that Ertekin handed him over to the security services, and he was killed during interrogation.

Sabahattin Ali's 100th birth anniversary was celebrated in the Turkish city of Bulgaria, Ardino on 31 March 2007. Ali is a well-known author in Bulgaria. His books have been read in schools in Bulgaria since the 1950s and he is especially well-regarded by the country's Turkish minority.

Legacy
His short novel "Madonna in A Fur Coat" (1943) is considered one of the best novellas in Turkish literature. Its translations have recently hit the best sellers lists and have sold a record number of copies in his country of birth. It first appeared on the pages of the daily Hakikat, 1941–42, in 48 instalments. With this novel, Sabahattin Ali became one of the two Turkish novelists (together with Ahmet Hamdi Tanpınar's "The Time Regulation Institute" ) whose works were published as Penguin Classics , where the novel was published in a translation by Maureen Freely and Alexander Dawe and with a scholarly introduction by David Selim Sayers.

Bibliography

Short stories
 "Değirmen" (1935) (Mill)
 "Kağnı" (1936) (Oxcart)
 "Ses" (1937) (Voice)
 "Yeni Dünya" (1943) (New World)
 "Sırça Köşk" (1947) (The Glass Palace)

Plays
 Esirler (1936)  (Prisoners)

Novels
 Kuyucaklı Yusuf (1937) (Yusuf of Kuyucak). Kuyucakli Yusuf was made into a movie by Turkish national television.
 İçimizdeki Şeytan (1940) (Devil Inside)
 Kürk Mantolu Madonna (1943). (Madonna in a Fur Coat)

Translation
 Tarihte Garip Vakalar (Strange Cases in History): Ankara, 1936
 Antigone, Sophokles: Istanbul, 1941
 Üç Romantik Hikaye (Three Romantic Stories): Ankara, 1943
 Fontamara, Ignazio Silone: Ankara, 1943
 Gyges ve Yüzüğü (En. Gyges and his Ring, Deutch: Gyges und sein Ring), Christian F. Hebbel: Ankara, 1944
In 2016, Madonna in a Fur Coat was translated into English by Maureen Freely and Alexander Dawe and published by Penguin Classics; the translation was reissued in 2021 with a new, scholarly introduction by David Selim Sayers.

Poetry
 Dağlar ve Rüzgâr (1934 - Second Edition 1943). (Mountains and Wind)

See also
 Turkish literature
 "Sabahattin Ali", by Asim Bezirci, 1974, paperback.

References

External links

 Daily Sabah: Sabahattin Ali: Tragic romance and dark realism 

1907 births
1948 deaths
People from Kardzhali Province
Turkish journalists
Turkish novelists
Turkish Marxists
Turkish male short story writers
Journalists killed in Turkey
Prisoners and detainees of Turkey
20th-century novelists
20th-century Turkish short story writers
Bulgarian Turks in Turkey
20th-century journalists
Turkish magazine founders